Hai Yang Shi You 981 (also known as Ocean Oil 981, Ocean Petroleum 981, HD-981) is a semi-submersible oil platform owned and operated by the China National Offshore Oil Corporation. The semi-sub Hai Yang Shi You 981 is equipped with Liebherr Cranes and Aker (AKMH) draw works complete with top drive. The rig designed by Friede & Goldman.

The rig began operation on May 9, 2012 in the South China Sea, 320 km southeast of Hong Kong, at a depth of 1,500 m. On May 2, 2014, the platform was moved near to the Paracel islands, a move Vietnam stated violated their territorial claims while Chinese officials said was legal as it falls within surrounding waters of the Paracel Islands which China militarily controls.

Since the dominion of its location is claimed by both China and Vietnam, this raised a storm of protest in Vietnam.

See also

Hai Yang Shi You 981 standoff
2014 Vietnam anti-China protests

References

External links
The Operation of the HYSY 981 Drilling Rig Background briefing published by the Ministry of Foreign Affairs of the People's Republic of China

China National Offshore Oil Corporation
No-U Movement
Drilling rigs
2010 ships